Harold Benjamin Simpson (1879-1924) was an English cricketer active from 1898 to 1911 who played for Northamptonshire (Northants). He was born in Higham Ferrers, Northamptonshire on 27 January 1879 and died in Chelveston-cum-Caldecott, Northamptonshire on 16 March 1924. He appeared in eight first-class matches as a righthanded batsman who scored 128 runs with a highest score of 44 and took nine wickets with a best performance of four for 29.

Notes

1879 births
1924 deaths
English cricketers
Northamptonshire cricketers